Enid Rosamund Ayodele Forde (born 1932) is a Sierra Leonean geographer. She was the first Sierra Leonean woman to gain a PhD, and chair of the geography department at Fourah Bay College.

Life

Forde gained her PhD at Northwestern University in 1966, with a dissertation on spatial variation in sociocultural and economic characteristics of people in Ghana.

In 1986 Forde helped to carry out Sierra Leone's national population census. She also participated in the family planning program.

References

1932 births
Possibly living people
Sierra Leonean geographers
Northwestern University alumni
Academic staff of Fourah Bay College
Sierra Leone Creole people
Sierra Leonean women academics